Nick Turnbull (born July 28, 1981) is a former professional gridiron football safety. He played college football for the FIU Golden Panthers.

Early life and education
Turnbull is the son of James and Patricia Turnbull. He was raised in Carol City and Opa-locka, Florida. 
He attended Charles W. Flanagan High School in Pembroke Pines, Florida, where he played four years of football and three of basketball. He is a three-time All-County selection. He was named All-State after making 193 tackles and a county record 23 interceptions as a senior in high school and averaged 21.7 points and 13 rebounds for the Falcon basketball team. Turnbull was a student at Florida International University from 2002 to 2005.

College career
Turnbull was on the FIU Golden Panthers football team. During his career there, he finished with 16 interceptions making him the school's all-time leader. He also ties for 1st in single-season and single-game interceptions, and is 6th on the career tackles list with 267.

Professional career
He was signed by the Atlanta Falcons as an undrafted free agent from 2006 - 2008.

Turnbull was signed by the Las Vegas Locomotives of the United Football League from 2009 - 2011.

Turnbull has also played for the Chicago Bears and Cincinnati Bengals as a practive squad member.

He was one of the first three signings by the expansion Ottawa Redblacks on November 27, 2013 but retired before he could play for them.

Personal
Turnbull lives in Miami, Florida. He is known as "The Truth". He modeled and appeared in GQ magazine and Vogue . He is currently working in surgery.

External links
Just Sports Stats

1981 births
Living people
Players of American football from Miami
American football safeties
FIU Panthers football players
Florida International University alumni
Atlanta Falcons players
Chicago Bears players
Cincinnati Bengals players
Las Vegas Locomotives players
Ottawa Redblacks players
People from Carol City, Florida
People from Opa-locka, Florida
Players of Canadian football from Miami